Andy Zay is an American businessman and politician serving as a member of the Indiana Senate from the 17th district. Elected in November 2016, he assumed office on December 20, 2016.

Early life and education 
Zay was born and raised in Huntington, Indiana. He earned a Bachelor of Science degree in human resources management and personnel administration from Indiana University Bloomington.

Career 
In 1989, Zay founded Zay Leasing & Rentals. He was elected to the Indiana Senate in November 2016 and assumed office on December 20, 2016. In the 2021–2022 legislative session, Zay has served as chair of the Senate Insurance and Financial Institutions Committee. He was previously the ranking member of the committee. In 2018, Zay was criticized when Facebook messages were uncovered in which Zay wrote "racism is not real."

On January 19, 2023, Zay announced that he is considering running for the United States House of Representatives in 2024.

References 

Living people
People from Huntington, Indiana
Businesspeople from Indiana
Republican Party Indiana state senators
Indiana University Bloomington alumni
Year of birth missing (living people)
21st-century American politicians